Bobby T. Shaw II (born April 23, 1975) is a former American football wide receiver in the National Football League. Shaw has played for five NFL teams: Seattle Seahawks, Pittsburgh Steelers, Jacksonville Jaguars, Buffalo Bills, and San Diego Chargers. Shaw attended Galileo High School and played college football at California. He graduated Cal as the school's all-time leader in receptions with 180 catches for 2,731 yards and 27 touchdowns.

In 1996, Steve Mariucci became Cal's head coach. Shaw prospered under Mariucci, with 12 catches for 168 yards in a game against UCLA and three touchdowns scores in a 48-42 triple-overtime win over Oregon State. In the Aloha Bowl following that season, Shaw scored twice on passes from Pat Barnes in Cal's 42-38 loss to the Navy. Shaw was named first-team All-Pac-10 for his performance that year.

In 1997, Shaw became captain on Tom Holmoe's first team. He set single-season records with 74 receptions for 1,093 yards and 11 touchdowns. It was a tough year for Cal, but Shaw helped deliver one of the Bears' three wins with 158 yards and 2 touchdowns in a 40-36 win over Oklahoma. He was again voted to the All-Pac-10 first team, and became the third Cal wide receiver to win first-team All-America honors from Sporting News. UCLA Head Coach Bob Toledo had stated "(he's) the best receiver in the conference, one of the best in the country, and he'll end up being the best receiver in Cal history."

Shaw was drafted in the 6th round by Seattle in 1998. He signed later that year with the Pittsburgh Steelers, and played six years with the Steelers, Jaguars, Bills, and Chargers.  He currently resides in Antioch, California.

References 

1975 births
Living people
Players of American football from San Francisco
African-American players of American football
American football wide receivers
California Golden Bears football players
Seattle Seahawks players
Pittsburgh Steelers players
Jacksonville Jaguars players
Buffalo Bills players
San Diego Chargers players
21st-century African-American sportspeople
20th-century African-American sportspeople